Montoso Gardens is a farm and plant nursery dedicated to growing plants for local consumption and export. It is located in the region of Maricao, in Puerto Rico. Its code of international recognition as a botanical institution, as well as the initials of its herbarium is MGMPR.

Location 
This botanical garden is located on the southern slope of the Pico Montoso mountain, at 1500 feet (457 m) altitude in the heart of the abrupt coffee region in Maricao, next to the Maricao State Forest of 5000 acres and with 23 species of endemic plants of the 128 existing in Puerto Rico. 

Montoso Gardens, Hwy 120 km 18.9, Box 692, Maricao, Puerto Rico, 00606

A donation is charged for the maintenance of the facilities.

History 
The previous owner, horticulturist Dr.Frank Martin, had already started a botanical collection, and numerous specimens of plants and trees come from this initial nucleus.
The current owners have been adding plant species since the year 1987, to the present day.

Collections 

In the botanical garden it exhibits tropical flora in all its exuberance and variety. One of their primary missions at the Montoso Gardens is the conservation of the various species of tropical plants. There are currently more than 1800 varieties of plants in its collections, representing multiple species and cultivar with over 600 taxa cultivated:

 Endemic species in the area
 Fruit trees;  Litchi chinensis, Canarium ovatum, Garcinia mangostana 
 Ornamental plants
 Spices, Piper nigrum, Durio zibethinus, Cinnamomum zeylanicum

See also 

 List of botanical gardens and arboretums in Puerto Rico
 Powell Gardens
 Salagon Gardens
 Elk Rock Gardens of the Bishop's Close
 Hakone Gardens

References 

Botanical gardens in Puerto Rico